In mathematics, a sequence of discrete orthogonal polynomials is a sequence of polynomials that are pairwise orthogonal with respect to a discrete measure.
Examples include the discrete Chebyshev polynomials, Charlier polynomials,  Krawtchouk polynomials, Meixner polynomials, dual Hahn polynomials,  Hahn polynomials, and Racah polynomials.

If the measure has finite support, then the corresponding sequence of discrete orthogonal polynomials has only a finite number of elements. The Racah polynomials give an example of this.

Definition 
Consider a discrete measure  on some set  with weight function .

where  is the Kronecker delta.

Remark 
Any discrete measure is of the form
 ,

Listeratur

References

Orthogonal polynomials